Dennis Oliver Baldry (born 26 December 1931) is a former English cricketer. He was a right-handed batsman and a right-arm off break bowler who played as an all-rounder.

Cricket career

With Middlesex
Baldry made his first-class debut for Middlesex in the 1953 County Championship against Essex, and took four wickets in the match. It would be another two years before he would represent Middlesex again.

He made his second appearance for Middlesex in the 1955 County Championship, making sixteen appearances for the county, scoring 295 runs. He made 49 first-class appearances for Middlesex up to 1958, scoring 1,155 runs at an average of 14.62, including five half centuries and a high score of 61. He also took 11 wickets with his off breaks at a bowling average of 31.09, with best figures of 4–60. While playing for Middlesex Baldry also represented the Marylebone Cricket Club in two first-class matches, both against Cambridge University.

With Hampshire
At the end of the 1958 season Baldry left Middlesex to join Hampshire. In the 1959 County Championship he made his Hampshire first-class debut against Glamorgan, scoring 151. The 1959 season was to prove to be Baldry's most successful, with 1,715 runs (four times his previous best) at an average of 29.06 and 32 wickets at an average of 32.00, which was his best season's bowling return. In 1959 he also once again represented the Marylebone Cricket Club in a first-class match against Oxford University. In 1959 he also represented AER Gilligan's XI in a match against the touring Indians, as well as representing an England XI against a Commonwealth XI cricket team. This was to be the closest he got to full international honours. In 1959 he was awarded his Hampshire cap.

Baldry played for Hampshire in their 1961 County Championship winning season, when he scored 618 runs at an average of 19.31, making three half centuries and a high score of 84*. In all he made 85 first-class appearances for Hampshire, playing his final match against Surrey in the 1962 County Championship. Baldry scored 3,342 runs for Hampshire at an average of 24.75, which included three centuries and eighteen half centuries. He took 70 wickets at an average of 36.77, claiming one five wicket haul which yielded his best bowling figures of 7–76.

Baldry's final appearance for Hampshire came in the new format of the game, List-A cricket. Baldry made his only List-A appearance for Hampshire in their first one-day game against Derbyshire in the 1963 Gillette Cup, where he scored seven runs and took 4/70 from his fifteen overs. He continued to represent Hampshire in the Second Eleven Championship, playing his final game for the Hampshire Second XI against the Sussex Second XI in 1967.

Overall Baldry played 139 first-class games, scoring 4,661 runs at an average of 20.90, with a high score of 151. He made 3 centuries and 23 half centuries. He took 83 wickets at an average of 37.06, which included one five wicket haul which gave him best figures of 7–76.

External links
Dennis Baldry at Cricinfo
Dennis Baldry at CricketArchive
Matches and detailed statistics for Dennis Baldry

1931 births
Living people
People from Acton, London
English cricketers
Middlesex cricketers
Marylebone Cricket Club cricketers
Hampshire cricketers
Non-international England cricketers
A. E. R. Gilligan's XI cricketers
Cricketers from Greater London